Draughton is a village and civil parish in West Northamptonshire, England.

The villages name means 'dray farm/settlement'.

Notable buildings
The Historic England website contains details of a total of five listed buildings in the parish of Draughton, all of which are Grade II apart from St Catherine's Church, which is Grade II*. They include:
St Catherine's Church
Church Farmhouse
Old Rectory
Thor missile site at former RAF Harrington
K6 telephone kiosk

References

External links

Villages in Northamptonshire
West Northamptonshire District
Civil parishes in Northamptonshire